The episodes of the anime series The Twelve Kingdoms are based on the novel series written by Fuyumi Ono and illustrated by Akihiro Yamada. The series aired from April 9, 2002 to August 30, 2003 in Japan on NHK where it ran for forty-five episodes until its conclusion. The opening theme is "Juunigenmukyoku" by Kunihiko Ryo while the ending theme is "Getsumei-Fuuei" by Mika Arisaka.The entire anime series has been released on DVD and Blu-ray in the United States by Media Blasters, which are now out of print. The license was transferred to Discotek Media, who released the complete series on Blu-ray in 2019.

Episode list

References

The Twelve Kingdoms
Twelve Kingdoms episodes